The third cabinet of prime minister of Romania Petre Roman took office from 30 April 1991 up until 16 October 1991. It was the 109th overall cabinet of Romania and ended three weeks after the September 1991 Mineriad which occurred in Bucharest. It was a single-party majority cabinet, plus independents.

Members
Single-party majority cabinet:  and 

Prime Minister: 
Petre Roman/Theodor Stolojan(ad interim)

Minister of State:
Dan Mircea Popescu (Co-ordinating Quality of Life)

Ministers:
Victor Babiuc (Justice)
Niculae Spiroiu (Defense)
Andrei Pleșu (Culture and Arts)
Ioan Țipu (Agriculture)
Adrian Năstase (Foreign Affairs)
Eugen Dijmărescu (Economy)
Doru Viorel Ursu (Interior)
Gheorghe Ștefan (Education)
Valeriu Eugen Pop (Environment)
Mihnea Marmeliuc (Labor)
Traian Băsescu (Transport)
Bogdan Marinescu (Health)
Andrei Chirică (Communication)
Victor Athanasie Stănculescu (Industry)
Constantin Fota (Commerce and Tourism)
Bogdan Niculescu-Duvăz (Youth and Sport)

Roman III Cabinet
1991 establishments in Romania
1991 disestablishments in Romania
Cabinets established in 1991
Cabinets disestablished in 1991